Late Flowers  is a 1970 drama film based on the novella of the same name by Anton Chekhov wrote in the early period of the writer's work.

Plot 
This is a story about unrequited love and belated insight.

The film shows the life of the family Priklonsky princes. The main character of Princess Maria (Irina Lavrenteva) pretty nice girl, loves her mother (Olga Zhizneva) and brother Yegorushka (Valery Zolotukhin). Brother is also deeply flawed man, not wanting to get rid of bad habits.

Soon it appears in the narrative and Dr. Toporkov (Alexander Lazarev). Maria and Yegorushka ill, and  the doctor Toporkov's mother called, because it was a high opinion of his professional qualities. He cured Priklonskii, took money from them, and that his visits to them over. However, Maroussia, having read novels about love, time to fall in love with the doctor.

Life heroes went downhill. Maroussia from all of life's troubles again ill. At the same Toporkov suddenly woke up feeling, but later, he finds himself unable to help her, and the princess died.

Cast 
Irina Lavrenteva as  Maroussia, Princess Priklonskaya
 Alexander Lazarev as Dr. Nikolai Semenovich Toporkov
 Olga Zhiznyeva as Princess Priklonskaya
 Valery Zolotukhin as Yegorushka  
 Inna Ulyanova as Kaleria Ivanovna
Alexander Khanov as Nikifor, valet
Irina Chaliapina-Baksheeva as Prohorovna, matchmaker
Zoya Vasilkova as Toporkova, the doctor's wife

References

External links

 Мегаэнциклопедия Кирилла и Мефодия

1970 drama films
1970 films
Soviet drama films
Russian drama films
Mosfilm films
Films based on works by Anton Chekhov
Films directed by Abram Room